Stelis bevilacquana is a species of orchid plant native to Venezuela.

References 

bevilacquana
Flora of Venezuela
Plants described in 2000